Zinc finger protein 160 is a protein that, in humans, is encoded by the ZNF160 gene.

The protein encoded by this gene is a Krüppel-related zinc finger protein which is characterized by the presence of an N-terminal repressor domain, the Kruppel-associated box (KRAB). The KRAB domain is a potent repressor of transcription; thus this protein may function in transcription regulation. Two alternative transcripts encoding the same isoform have been described.

References

Further reading